Stage Left is Martin Barre's studio album, released in 2003. The title is a reference to his hallowed position on the Jethro Tull stage assignment. It was the first album of Martin Barre to be released both in U.K and in the United States. Stage Left was supported with a tour in small venues.

Musical style
Featuring 13 instrumental tracks (and one with vocals, "Don't Say a Word"), Barre moves through a wide range of guitar-based styles including (but not limited to) classical and blues acoustics, progressive rock, acoustic folk, 80s-styled finger picking and even ambient electronic styles.

Martin stated that the album was conceived with most attention to the melodies, thinking always in the balance between acoustic and electric pieces. The album shows a great variety of guitars and other string instruments, as the bouzouki and the mandolin.

Critical reception
The AllMusic review, by William Ruhlmann, was positive. Giving three stars, the review goes to praise Martin taste for melodies instead of simple guitar solos, also stating Martin's "highly textured approach, playing electric rock guitar much of the time as if he was playing English folk music on an acoustic."

Track listing

Personnel
Musicians
Martin Barre – Electric and Acoustic Guitars, Bouzouki, Flute, Mandolin
Jonathan Noyce – Bass
Andrew Giddings – Keyboards
Darren Mooney – Drums
Simon Burrett – Vocals (on "Don't Say a Word")

Additional personnel
Mark Tucker – Recording Engineer

Release history
2003, UK, RandM Records RAMCD002, Release date 4 August 2003, CD
2003, USA, Fuel 2000 061327, Release date 12 August 2003, CD

References

2003 albums